Rampal Yadav is an Indian politician and a member of the 16th Legislative Assembly in India. He represents the Biswan constituency of Uttar Pradesh and was a member of the Samajwadi Party political party until 2017.

Early life and education
Rampal Yadav was born in Sitapur district. He attended the famous Col. Brown Cambridge School in Dehra Dun and later the Janta College in Sitapur.

Political career
Rampal Yadav has been a MLA for two terms. He represented the Biswan constituency and was a member of the Samajwadi Party political party, when he left the party to join the Lok Dal.

He is married to Shanti Yadav and has four children, two sons and two daughters.
Rampal left Samajwadi party and joined Bahujan Samaj Party.

Suspension
SP expelled him in April 2016 for his involvement in illegal activities. A complex built by him was demolished by Lucknow Development Authority. He was arrested along with 8 others including former MLA Rajendra Yadav. On 26 December, Yadav was accepted back into the SP.

Posts held

See also
 Biswan (Assembly constituency)
 Sixteenth Legislative Assembly of Uttar Pradesh
 Uttar Pradesh Legislative Assembly

References 

1964 births
Living people
People from Sitapur district
People from Uttar Pradesh
Samajwadi Party politicians
Uttar Pradesh MLAs 2012–2017
Uttar Pradesh MLAs 2002–2007